Doumea angolensis is a species of loach catfish endemic to Angola where it is found in the Benguela interior and the Kwanza River system.

It reaches lengths of 7 cm.

References 
 

Amphiliidae
Endemic fauna of Angola
Freshwater fish of Angola
Catfish of Africa
Taxa named by George Albert Boulenger
Fish described in 1906